The 2012–13 Phoenix Coyotes season was the franchise's 34th season in the National Hockey League (NHL), the 17th in Arizona, and 41st overall, including its play in the World Hockey Association. The regular season was reduced from its usual 82 games to 48 due to the 2012–13 NHL lockout.

Off-season

Regular season
The Coyotes concluded the regular season having been shut-out nine times, tied with the Nashville Predators for the most in the NHL.

Standings

Schedule and results

Playoffs
For the first time since the 2008–09 season, the Coyotes failed to make the playoffs.

Player statistics
Final stats
Skaters

Goaltenders

†Denotes player spent time with another team before joining the Coyotes.  Stats reflect time with the Coyotes only.
‡Traded mid-season
Bold/italics denotes franchise record

Transactions 
The Coyotes have been involved in the following transactions during the 2012–13 season.

Trades

Free agents acquired

Free agents lost

Player signings

Draft picks 

Phoenix Coyotes' picks at the 2012 NHL Entry Draft, held in Pittsburgh, Pennsylvania on June 22 & 23, 2012.

Draft notes
 The Colorado Avalanche's fourth-round pick went to the Phoenix Coyotes as a result of a June 28, 2010, trade that sent Daniel Winnik to the Avalanche in exchange for this pick.
 The Phoenix Coyotes' fourth-round pick went to the Nashville Predators as the result of an October 28, 2011, trade that sent Cal O'Reilly to the Coyotes in exchange for this pick.
 The Montreal Canadiens' seventh-round pick went to the Phoenix Coyotes as a result of an October 23, 2011, trade that sent Petteri Nokelainen and Garrett Stafford to the Canadiens in exchange for Brock Trotter and this pick.

See also 
 2012–13 NHL season

References

Arizona Coyotes seasons
Phoenix
Phoenix